General Cooper may refer to:

Douglas H. Cooper (1815–1879), Confederate States Army brigadier general
Edward Cooper (British Army officer) (1858–1945), British Army major general
George Cooper (British Army officer) (1925–2020), British Army general
James Cooper (Pennsylvania politician) (1810–1863), Maryland Volunteers brigadier general in the American Civil War
John Cooper (British Army officer) (born 1955), British Army lieutenant general
John B. Cooper (fl. 1980s–2010s), U.S. Air Force lieutenant general 
Joseph Alexander Cooper (1823–1910), Union Army brigadier general and brevet major general
Kenneth Cooper (British Army officer) (1905–1981), British Army major general
Matthew T. Cooper (born 1934), U.S. Marine Corps lieutenant general
Nathan A. Cooper (1802–1879), New Jersey state cavalry brigadier general
Samuel Cooper (general) (1798–1876), Confederate States Army general
Simon Cooper (British Army officer) (born 1936), British Army major general
William E. Cooper (general) (born 1929) U.S. Army major general

See also
Attorney General Cooper (disambiguation)